Bryan Carrott is an American jazz musician playing vibraphone and marimba.

He has recorded with Butch Morris, Henry Threadgill, Dave Douglas, David "Fathead" Newman, Ralph Peterson, Steven Kroon, Greg Osby, Tom Harrell, John Lurie and The Lounge Lizards, Jay-Z and others.

Carrott is an assistant professor and coordinator of percussion instruction at Five Towns College.

Discography With Ralph Peterson
Ralph Peterson presents The Fo'tet (1991) Blue Note 

Ralph Peterson's Fo'tet: Ornettology (1991) Blue Note/Somethin Else

Ralph Peterson Fo'tet: The Reclamation Project (1991) Evidence 

Ralph Petersn Fo’tet: The Fo'tet Plays Monk  (1997)

Ralph Peterson Jr and The Fo'tet: Back to Stay (1999)

With Muhal Richard Abrams
Song for All (Black Saint, 1995 [1997])
One Line, Two Views (New World, 1995)
With Dave Douglas
Witness (RCA, 2001)
With David "Fathead" Newman
Under a Woodstock Moon (Kokopelli, 1996)
Chillin' (HighNote, 1999)
Davey Blue (HighNote, 2002)
The Gift (HighNote, 2003)
With Greg Osby
Art Forum (Blue Note)
With Henry Threadgill
Everybodys Mouth's a Book (Pi, 2001)

References

1959 births
Living people
American jazz vibraphonists
Place of birth missing (living people)
The Lounge Lizards members
African-American jazz musicians
Jazz musicians from New York (state)
20th-century vibraphonists
21st-century vibraphonists
American marimbists
21st-century African-American people
20th-century African-American people
American percussionists